New Favorite is the fourth album by bluegrass music group Alison Krauss & Union Station, released August 14, 2001. The album peaked in the top 50 of the Billboard 200 and within the top 5 of the Billboard charts for both Country and Bluegrass and was certified gold. This album was released in the same year as the O Brother, Where Art Thou? soundtrack, which Krauss appeared on, that had a large effect on bluegrass in the United States. At the 44th Grammy Awards, New Favorite would go on to win the Grammy Award for Best Bluegrass Album and the single "The Lucky One" won the Grammy Award for Best Country Performance by a Duo or Group with Vocal as well as Best Country Song.

Track listing
 "Let Me Touch You for Awhile" (Robert Lee Castleman) – 3:21
 "The Boy Who Wouldn't Hoe Corn" (Traditional) – 4:40
 "The Lucky One" (Castleman) – 3:10 	
 "Choctaw Hayride" (Jerry Douglas) – 3:10 	
 "Crazy Faith" (Mark Simos) – 3:47 	
 "Momma Cried" (Bob Lucas) – 3:20 	
 "I'm Gone" (Eric Kaz, Wendy Waldman) – 3:28
 "Daylight" (Lucas) – 4:03 	
 "Bright Sunny South" (Traditional) – 3:00 	
 "Stars" (Dan Fogelberg) – 2:54	
 "It All Comes Down to You" (Ron Block) – 2:44 	
 "Take Me for Longing" (Simos) – 2:51 	
 "New Favorite" (David Rawlings, Gillian Welch) – 4:34

Personnel
 Alison Krauss – lead vocals, fiddle, viola
 Dan Tyminski – background vocals, acoustic guitar, mandolin 
 Ron Block – background vocals, acoustic guitar, banjo
 Jerry Douglas – dobro, lap steel guitar
 Barry Bales – background vocals, upright bass
 Larry Atamanuik – drums, percussion

Charts

Weekly charts

Year-end charts

References

2001 albums
Alison Krauss & Union Station albums
Rounder Records albums
Grammy Award for Best Bluegrass Album